Daniel Prévost (born 20 October 1939) is a French actor, comedian and writer.

Early life

Daniel Prévost, alias Denis Forestier, was born to Micheline Chevalier  and Mohand Ait Salem. His father was of Berber descent from Algeria (Kabylie region), a fact which he did not discover until later life.

Personal life
He is the father of actors Sören Prévost, Erling Prévost and Christophe Prévost.

Career
After attending drama school in Paris, Prévost made his theatre début alongside the likes of Michel Serrault in Un certain M. Blot.  In his early beginnings he both performed alongside Boby Lapointe and became acquainted with Jean Yanne, later becoming one of the latter's favourite actors.

Although his television and cinema career began in the 1960s, it was in the 1970s that he found fame through Jacques Martin's satirical news programme Le petit rapporteur, the part for which he is best known.

He excelled as an evilly leering tax inspector – "he'd audit his own mother" in Francis Veber's 1998 comedy Le Dîner de Cons for which he won the César Award for best supporting actor.

Filmography

Theater

References

External links

 

1939 births
20th-century French male actors
21st-century French male actors
French male stage actors
French people of Kabyle descent
Living people
French male film actors
French male television actors
French male screenwriters
French screenwriters
French humorists
Best Supporting Actor César Award winners